Peter William Thorne is a climatologist and professor of physical geography in the Department of Geography, Maynooth University.

He graduated with a BSc in Environmental Sciences from the University of East Anglia in 1998, and a PhD from the School of Environmental Sciences in 2001. He previously worked at the Hadley Centre for Climate Prediction and Research and the National Climatic Data Center, and he was a senior scientist at the Nansen Environmental and Remote Sensing Center, Bergen, Norway.
He is the chair of the International Surface Temperature Initiative which consists of an interdisciplinary effort to create a suite of improved Land Surface Air Temperature products to meet science needs and societal expectations in the era of climate services.
Thorne is co-chair of the GCOS Working Group on the Global Climate Observing System Reference Upper Air Network (GRUAN), and he is also the project lead on the Horizon 2020 GAIA-CLIM project which aims to use such measurements to better characterise satellite measurements.
He is one of the 831 Lead Authors of the IPCC Fifth Assessment Report.

References

Year of birth missing (living people)
Living people
Academics of Maynooth University
Alumni of the University of East Anglia
Intergovernmental Panel on Climate Change lead authors